Plamen Kozhuharov (born 20 January 1992) is a retired Bulgarian footballer who most recently played for Yantra Gabrovo as a forward.

References

Living people
1992 births
Bulgarian footballers
Association football forwards
PFC Vidima-Rakovski Sevlievo players
PFC Kaliakra Kavarna players
FC Yantra Gabrovo players
First Professional Football League (Bulgaria) players